The 1889–90 Football Alliance was the first season of the Football Alliance, an association football league which was set up in England as an alternative to The Football League, which had begun in the 1888–89 season. A proposal that the Football League be expanded to 24 teams was rejected, so a new league was formed to cater for those excluded. Twelve clubs were accepted for membership, the same number as in the Football League, and they were drawn from a similar geographical area, stretching from the Midlands to the North West, but also further east in Sheffield, Grimsby and Sunderland.

Two points were awarded for a win and one point for a draw, each team played every other team once at home and once away from home. The Wednesday were the first champions; after hitting an eight-match winning run which started in November, they found themselves at the top of the league by the end of December, and remained there for the rest of the season. Long Eaton Rangers finished last of the 12 clubs and dropped out to join the Midland Football League.

Final league table

Results

Stadia and locations

Team kits
These were the kits worn by the teams that season.

The Football League election process
At the Football League election meeting no vote was taken, but it was agreed that Burnley and Notts County were re-elected to the Football League and that Sunderland was elected to join the League in place of Stoke, who would play in the Football Alliance the following season.

The applications of Football Alliance sides Bootle, Darwen, Grimsby Town, Newton Heath and Sunderland Albion to join the League were rejected.

See also
 1889–90 in English football
 1889 in association football
 1890 in association football

References

1889-90
2